Kashino is a rural locality (a selo) and the administrative center of Kashinsky Selsoviet, Aleysky District, Altai Krai, Russia. The population was 677 as of 2013. There are 12 streets.

Geography 
Kashino is located on the Aley River, 25 km southwest of Aleysk (the district's administrative centre) by road. Krasny Yar is the nearest rural locality.

References 

Rural localities in Aleysky District